The Roman Catholic Diocese of Tolagnaro is a Latin suffragan diocese in the Ecclesiastical province of Fort-Dauphin in Madagascar, yet still depends on the missionary Roman Congregation for the Evangelization of Peoples.

Its cathedral episcopal seat is in Fort-Dauphin (Madagascar) .

Statistics 
As per 2014 it pastorally served 128,000 Catholics (11.4% of 1,120,000 total) on 45,000 km2 in 16 parishes and 2 missions with 37 priests (17 diocesan, 20 religious), 134 lay religious (36 brothers, 98 sisters) and 15 seminarians.

Antecedents 
Early 16th century - First Roman Catholic priests to Madagascar arrive with a colony of Portuguese emigrants who established a community at Tranovato, some 9 km. west of Fort Dauphin bay. They were mostly Jesuits, not Portuguese by birth, and were reportedly all massacred with the rest of the settlers during a celebration held outside their fort.
1613 - Jesuit Fathers Mariana and Freire, aboard the Portuguese Nossa Senhora, performed daily Mass on the shore of Ranofotsy bay, while this ship was there. Of the Antanosy which came to observe this, some sought to kiss the image of Saint Luke while others were wearing pewter crosses around their necks and some even had tattoos of crosses. Father Mariana establishes a chapel and house at the old Tranovato site, preaching daily while the house was being constructed. Drian-Ramaka, the 12 year old Antanosy son of the local Antanosy king, was kidnapped and sent to Goa for 2 years of study at the Jesuit College of Santa Fe.
1615 - Drian-Ramaka, having been baptized, returns to Anosy with 3 Jesuit missionaries and 5 other foreigners, where they established a mission at Tranovato in 1616. Fathers Custodio de Costa and Manuel d'Almeida remain in Anosy, but conflicts grow with the local ombiasa and king, who seeks to starve them into exile. The mission only succeeds in baptizing one person before they leave in 1617.
1620 - Jesuits abandon their mission efforts in Anosy, never to return.
1648 - First Lazarist missionaries were sent from France by St. Vincent de Paul to Fort Dauphin. The first superior of this Lazarist mission was M. Nacquart who left France with the Sieur de Flacourt, the Governor sent by the Societe de l'Orient, and his associate, M. Gondree. They worked on evangelization amid many difficulties, but M. Gondree died in 1649 and M. Nacquart died from fever in 1650. During these 14 months of work, 77 people were baptized.
1654 - MM. Mounier and Bourdaise arrived to continue the missionary work, but they too, soon died. Three additional missionaries sent to their assistance never reached Fort Dauphin as they all died en route.
1663 - M. Almeras, the successor of St. Vincent de Paul in the government of the Congregation of St. Lazare, sent M. Etienne, Apostolic prefect, to Fort-Dauphin with two brethren and several workmen. On Christmas Day he baptized 15 little children and 4 adults, but then died soon thereafter.
1665-67 - 9 new missionaries, 4 lay brothers and 2 Recollect Fathers left for Fort Dauphin. At one time Fort Dauphin had a chapel, monastery and library.
1671 - The Compagnie des Indes, which had succeeded to the Société de l'Orient, decided to quit Madagascar, so M. Jolly, M. Almeras' successor, recalled his missionaries in Fort Dauphin. Only 2 out of a total of 37 who had been sent to the island, were able to return to France, arriving back there in 1676. On the other hand, by the time they left in 1674, hundreds of Antanosy had been baptized and both a French-Antanosy dictionary and a Catechism in the Antanosy language had been published in Paris. [for more information on the early history of the Roman Catholic efforts in Anosy see. For the time between 1648 and 1676, see 
1895 - Permanent Catholic Missions in southern Madagascar started in Fort Dauphin by Paulist priests and the Sisters of Charity.

History 
 Established on 1896.01.16 as Apostolic Vicariate of Southern Madagascar, on territory split off from the Apostolic Vicariate of Madagascar
 Renamed on 1913.05.20 after its see as Apostolic Vicariate of Fort-Dauphin
 Promoted on 1955.09.14 as Diocese of Fort-Dauphin
 Lost territories twice : on 1957.04.08 to establish the Diocese of Tuléar and Diocese of Farafangana, and on 1967.04.13 to establish the Diocese of Ihosy.
 Renamed on 1989.11.23 (like its see) as Diocese of Fort-Dauphin (Madagascar).

Ordinaries 
(all Roman rite; so far members of a Latin missionary congregation, until 2001 French)

 Apostolic Vicar of Southern Madagascar  
 Jean-Jacques Crouzet, Lazarists (C.M.) (1896.01.16 – 1913.05.20 see below), Titular Bishop of Zephyrium (1888.10.01 – 1933.01.08); previously Apostolic Vicar of Abyssinia of the Ethiopics (Eastern Catholic, Ethiopia) (1888.10.01 – 1896.01.16)
 Coadjutor Vicar Apostolic Charles-François Lasne, C.M. (1911.02.15 – death 1927.06.23), Titular Bishop of Olba (1911.02.15 – 1927.06.23), died without succeeding to see

 Apostolic Vicars of Fort-Dauphin 
 Jean-Jacques Crouzet, C.M. (see above 1913.05.20 – death 1933.01.08)
 Antonio Sévat, C.M. (1933.01.08 – 1952.10), Titular Bishop of Ezerus (1928.07.02 – death 1957.07.06), succeeding as former Coadjutor Vicar Apostolic of Fort-Dauphin (1928.07.02 – 1933.01.08)
 Alphonse-Marie-Victor Fresnel, C.M. (1953.03.04 – 1955.09.14 see below), Titular Bishop of Cataquas (1953.02.04 – 1955.09.14)

Suffragan Bishops of Fort-Dauphin 
 Alphonse-Marie-Victor Fresnel, C.M. (see above 1955.09.14 – retired 1968.09.26); emeritate as Titular Bishop of Siminina (1968.09.26 – resigned 1971.07.21); died 1983
 Jean-Pierre-Dominique Zévaco, C.M. (1968.09.26 – 1989.11.23 see below)

Suffragan Bishops of Tôla(g)naro 
 Jean-Pierre-Dominique Zévaco, C.M. (see above'' 1989.11.23 – retired 2001.04.24)
 Vincent Rakotozafy (since 2001.04.24 - ...), no previous prelature

References

Sources and external links 

 GCatholic.org with Google satellite photo

Roman Catholic dioceses in Madagascar
Religious organizations established in 1896
Roman Catholic dioceses and prelatures established in the 19th century
Roman Catholic Ecclesiastical Province of Toliara